Elmley Lovett in Worcestershire, England is a civil parish whose residents' homes are quite loosely clustered east of its Hartlebury Trading Estate, as well as in minor neighbourhood Cutnall Green to the near south-east. The latter is a loosely linear settlement that includes a pub-restaurant and farm shop on the Elmley Lovett side of the boundaries; it continues passing its near-square public green into the parish of Elmbridge, a similarly sized parish over to the east.

The village is  NNW of Droitwich, but Cutnall Green is closer to 4 miles.

St Michael's Church
The old stone parish church, much restored, has four very tall lancet windows to each side of the nave and a modest bell tower topped by a tall stone spire. It is flanked by a scattering of tall trees.

History
The Moule family of Snead's Green House were among the most prominent local landowners from the 1620s until the late nineteenth century, when the family died out in the male line.

Deserted medieval village

Around St Michael's churchyard are the remains of a deserted medieval village. (It is a scheduled monument.) The abandonment may have been due to the migration of the inhabitants to Cutnall Green; the period when this may have happened is not known.

To the south and west of the church are banks and ditches, remains of up to four houses with associated yards and garden plots. South of these are irregular enclosures that were stock pens or were used for cultivation. There are at least three trackways, running from the present-day lane, eastwards across the earthworks towards the moated site and church.

References

Villages in Worcestershire
Deserted medieval villages in Worcestershire